Treloquithack is a hamlet northeast of Helston, Cornwall, England, United Kingdom.

References

Hamlets in Cornwall